The 1968 Queen's Club Championships was a men's tennis tournament played on outdoor grass courts. It was the 69th edition of the Queen's Club Championships, the first to be held in the Open Era, and was played at the Queen's Club in London in the United Kingdom from 17 June until 22 June 1968.

Final
 Clark Graebner vs.  Tom Okker
 The singles final was cancelled due to rain.

References

External links
 ATP tournament profile
 ITF tournament edition details

 
Queen's Club Championships
Queen's Club Championships
Queen's Club Championships
Queen's Club Championships
Queen's Club Championships